Sila Puafisi (born 15 April 1988) is a Tongan international rugby union player, currently playing for  in the Bunnings NPC. He previously played for Glasgow Warriors.

Career
He played for Tasman Mako where they won the 2013 ITM Cup Championship.

He moved, in 2013, to Gloucester Rugby in the Aviva Premiership and was part of the squad that won the 2014–15 European Rugby Challenge Cup but was not used in the Final match against Edinburgh Rugby.

It was announced on 27 August 2015 that the prop had signed for Pro12 champions Glasgow Warriors on a one year deal.

On 3 January 2017, Puafisi signs for French club CA Brive in the Top 14 from the 2017-18 season.

He signed for La Rochelle for the 2018-19 season.

In 2021 season he was back playing for the Karaka Rugby club in the Counties Manukau region of New Zealand.

International career

He made his international debut for Tonga in the 2011 IRB Pacific Nations Cup against Japan, losing at 28–27. He was called up to Tonga for the 2013 Autumn Internationals against Romania, France and Wales.

References

External links

1988 births
Living people
Tongan rugby union players
Tonga international rugby union players
Tasman rugby union players
Gloucester Rugby players
Rugby union props
Tongan expatriate rugby union players
Tongan expatriate sportspeople in Scotland
Expatriate rugby union players in Scotland
Glasgow Warriors players
People from Vavaʻu
CA Brive players
Stade Rochelais players
Counties Manukau rugby union players
Northland rugby union players